Parectopa grisella is a moth of the family Gracillariidae. It is known from Indonesia (Java) and Malaysia (West Malaysia).

The larvae feed on Manilkara zapota and Mimusops elengi. They probably mine the leaves of their host plant.

References

Gracillariinae